"Rat Race" is a song written by Child'ƨ Play members Nicky Kay and John Allen for their debut EP Ruff House and eventually re-recorded with some added songwriting from bassist Marion Idzi for their debut studio album of the same name.

Ruff House version
The song originally appeared on the band's EP Ruff House and was slightly different from the version that would appear on their debut studio album, with the biggest notable change being a spoken word passage between a boy's father walking in his room, telling him to get a job, cut his hair, and get his girlfriend out of the house.

Music video
The music video featured the band playing the song on an empty stage. Brian Jack and John Allen sing their respective lines of the song while Nicky Kay and Idzi play their guitars while spinning their hair and headbanging. When it comes time for the second guitar solo, a guitar is thrown to Jack from off screen and he plays the solo. The video features film reel graphics and rats running across the screen occasionally.

Track listing

References

1986 songs
1990 singles
Child's Play (band) songs
Songs written by Nicky Kay
Songs written by Marion Idzi
Song recordings produced by Howard Benson